William Maunder Crocker (born 1843 Devon, England – died 1899 Surrey, England) was an administrator in Borneo.

Education
Crocker was educated at a private school in Plymouth.

Career
In 1864, Crocker joined the Sarawak civil service, eventually deputising for the Rajah, although from 1870–1874 he was involved in business, operating a sago factory at Mukah. In 1887, he became Governor of British North Borneo, but only for a year. The present-day Crocker Range in Sabah, Borneo is named after him.

Personal life
Born in South Tawton, on the N edge of Dartmoor; son of Emanuel, a tailor, and Susan. Married in London in 1878. He died in Surrey, England in 1899.

References

Governors of North Borneo
1843 births
1899 deaths